Hesters Store is an unincorporated community in Person County, North Carolina,  United States. It lies at the intersection of Gordonton Road(State Road 1102) with Hesters Store Road (State Road 1162) and Wilson Road (State Road 1162). The community derives its name from a country store that stood near the intersection for more than a century.  In 1994, the most recent country store structure was converted into a fire station, the Hesters Store station of the Hurdle Mills Volunteer Fire Department.

Neighboring North Carolina communities and municipalities include: Bushy Fork, Hurdle Mills, Gordonton, Roxboro, Leasburg, Yanceyville, Prospect Hill.

Unincorporated communities in Person County, North Carolina
Unincorporated communities in North Carolina